The 2010 European Speedway Club Champions' Cup was the 13th UEM European Speedway Club Champions' Cup season. The Final take place on 2 October 2010 in Miskolc, Hungary. The Cup was won by Russian SK Turbina Balakovo.

Results
 The Final
  Miskolc
 2 October 2010

Heat details

The Final 
October 2, 2010
  Miskolc
Speedway Arena Miskolc (Length: 367 m)
Referee and Jury President:  Anthony Steele
References

See also
 2010 in sports

References

2010
European Club